Fox Sci-Fi is an Australian subscription television channel which focused on airing fantasy TV series. The channel launched on 31 December 2019, replacing the Australian feed of Syfy.

Programs

 Angel
 Buffy the Vampire Slayer
 Battlestar Galactica (1978)
 Battlestar Galactica (2004)
 Charmed
 Heroes
 Star Trek: The Next Generation
 Star Trek: The Original Series
 Star Trek: Voyager
 Star Trek: Deep Space Nine
 The X-Files
 The Gifted

References

External links
 Foxtel Website

2019 establishments in Australia
English-language television stations in Australia
Television networks in Australia
Television channels and stations established in 2019
Foxtel
Science fiction television channels